The sport of association football in the country of Palau is run by the Palau Soccer Association. The association administers the national football team, as well as the Palau Soccer League.

International Football

Palau is one of the few sovereign states not to be a FIFA member and is only an associate member of the OFC. This means the nation does not have a national team competing in OFC Nations Cup qualifiers or FIFA World Cup qualifiers.

The Palau national team instead tend to play small-scale matches against other non-FIFA members. They play their matches at the 4,000 capacity PCC Track and Field Stadium (National Stadium) in the old capital of Koror.

Domestic football

Senior Club football

There does not seem to be fixed clubs in Palau. Instead, teams are put together only once a year, for the Palau Soccer League. Team Bangladesh is the oldest club in Palau, founded in 2004.

Palau Soccer League

The Palau Soccer Association currently runs one domestic football tournament for the amateur teams in the country. This tournament, the Palau Soccer League has been contested since 2004 with 3 of the 8 seasons so far won by Team Bangladesh.

Youth Club football

Palau Youth Soccer League

As well as the adult league, since 2013, the Palau Soccer Association has been running the Palau Youth Soccer League for young players to help their development.

Belau Games

In addition to the Palau Soccer League, football has also been introduced to the Belau Games, with the inaugural tournament contested in 2011. Unlike the Palau Soccer League which is club based, this appears to be a regional football competition.

National football stadium

See also
Palau national football team
Palau Soccer Association
Palau Soccer League
Palau Youth Soccer Association
List of football clubs in Palau

References